The Bermudian cricket team toured Canada between 12 and 25 August 2006. The two teams played a Group B match in the 2006–07 ICC Intercontinental Cup and 2 One-day Internationals. The second one-day international formed part of the 2006 ICC Americas Championship Division One which also included Argentina, Cayman Islands and United States.

This was originally scheduled to be a triangular series between Bermuda, Canada and Kenya. However, after Kenya rescheduled their ODIs with Bangladesh due to their lack of financial backing, they also cancelled their matches against Bermuda.

ICC Inter-Continental Cup 2006–07

One Day Internationals (ODIs)

Bermuda won the series 2–0.

1st ODI

2nd ODI

References

2006 in Canadian cricket
International cricket tours of North America
International cricket competitions in 2006